"The Mechanism" is a song by British electronic music duo Disclosure and Friend Within. It was released as a digital download in the United Kingdom on 15 April 2014. The song peaked at number 28 on the UK Dance Chart.

Track listings

Chart performance

Weekly charts

Release history

References

Disclosure (band) songs
2014 singles
2014 songs
Island Records singles